Robert Ironside may refer to:

 Robert Ironside (footballer) (born 1967), New Zealand soccer player
 Robert Ironside (businessman) (1854–1910), Canadian businessman
 Robert T. Ironside, a fictional character played by Raymond Burr in the 1967 TV series Ironside (1967–1975)
 Robert Ironside, a fictional character played by Blair Underwood in the 2013 TV series Ironside